Bolsheternovoy is a rural locality (a khutor) and the administrative center of Bolsheternovskoye Rural Settlement, Chernyshkovsky District, Volgograd Oblast, Russia. The population was 576 as of 2010. There are 7 streets.

Geography 
Bolsheternovoy is located 22 km northeast of Chernyshkovsky (the district's administrative centre) by road. Maloternovoy is the nearest rural locality.

References 

Rural localities in Chernyshkovsky District